Lipopolysaccharide-responsive and beige-like anchor protein is a protein that in humans is encoded by the LRBA gene.

Patients with Chediak-Higashi syndrome (CHS1; MIM 214500) suffer from a systemic immunodeficiency involving defects in polarized trafficking of vesicles in a number of immune system cell types. In mouse, this syndrome is reproduced in strains with a mutation in the 'beige' gene that results in proteins lacking the BEACH (beige and CHS1) domain and C-terminal WD repeats. LRBA contains key features of both beige/CHS1 and A kinase anchor proteins (AKAPs; see MIM 602449).[supplied by OMIM]

Deficiency of this protein in humans causes the condition known as LPS-responsive beige-like anchor protein deficiency.

References

Further reading

External links